New London High School (NLHS) is a public high school in New London, Ohio, United States.  It is the only high school in the New London Local School District.  Athletic teams are known as the Wildcats with school colors of red and black and the school is a member of the Firelands Conference.

State championships

Spencer Cole 400m Dash Boys track and field – 2016
Team Championship Boys cross country – 1993
Keith Shepherd Shot Put Boys track and field – 1988
Shawn Tappel 145lb Wrestling – 1985
Willard Ferrel Shot Put Boys track and field – 1983
Todd Wyckoff 185lb Wrestling – 1980 & 1981
Liz Schick, Julie Bennett, Vickie Jackson, Barb Schick 4x800 Meter Relay Girls track and field – 1980
Jim Farnsworth 175lb Wrestling – 1978
Stan Cooke Golf – 1978

Notable alumni
 Robin Meade, CNN anchor

References

External links
 

High schools in Huron County, Ohio
Public high schools in Ohio